Gui Cavalcanti is a robotics engineer who co-founded Open Source Medical Supplies, Artisan's Asylum, and MegaBots Inc.

Education 
Cavalcanti studied engineering at Olin College and worked as a professor there after graduation.

Career 
Cavalcanti initially worked at Boston Dynamics, before creating communal workshop Artisan's Asylum in Somerville, Massachusetts, in 2010 which Wired magazine reported as being the world's largest hackerspace.

Cavalcanti co-founded California based MegaBots Inc., a company that built a giant fighting robot that appeared in the Guinness book of records and on Jay Leno's Garage in 2018. In 2015 Cavalcanti uploaded a video to YouTube inviting the team that owned and operated Japanese fighting robot Kuratas to a duel.

Cavalcanti stars in the movie The Giant Robot Duel: MegaBots vs. Suidobashi.

In 2020, in response to the COVID-19 pandemic, Cavalcanti co-founded Open Source Medical Supplies, an organization that collates and shared open source designs for medical supplies.

See also 

 Artisan's Asylum
 MegaBots Inc.

References 

Living people

Year of birth missing (living people)

Hackers

Open source advocates
Open source people
21st-century American engineers
Ethical hackers
American technology company founders